Elegeia was a city of ancient Armenia located in modern Erzurum Province in northeastern Turkey; several important episodes between the Roman Empire, Armenia and the Parthians took place there.

Location 
The exact location of Elegeia is not known. It is usually located near Ilıca, between Erzurum and Askale. Ptolemy located Elegeia at roughly the same latitude as Artaxata; Pliny the Elder placed it on the Euphrates river; Stephen of Byzantium indicates that Elegeia was beyond the Euphrates and that it was mentioned in book VIII of the Parthica of Arrian. In any case, Elegeia was an important stage in the road to Satala at the heart of the kingdom of Armenia.

History 
Due to its strategic location, Elegeia was often the scene of confrontations between Rome, Armenia and the Parthian or Persian empire. At least two important episodes took place there.

In 114, King Parthamasiris of Armenia came to meet Emperor Trajan there to receive his investiture. Trajan refused to make him king, and instead conquered Armenia. It was also from Elegeia that Trajan led campaigns against the northern neighbors of Armenia.

It was also in Elegeia that at the end of 161 Marcus Sedatius Severianus was defeated by the Parthian army of Vologases IV of Parthia.

References 

Populated places in Armenia Minor
Roman towns and cities in Turkey
Populated places in ancient Cappadocia